Lindenthal may refer to:

 Lindenthal, Cologne, a borough of the City of Cologne, Germany
 a suburb of Leipzig, site of a subcamp of Buchenwald
 Gustav Lindenthal